Atholton High School is a high school in Columbia, Maryland, United States and is a part of the Howard County public school system. The school hosts an Army JROTC program. The school mascot is the Raider.

History
Atholton takes its name from a  land grant named "Athol" granted from King Charlles to James MacGill 17 August 1732. He built a nearby manor house named "Athol" built between 1732 and 1740. The name "Athol" was created to honor MacGill's ancestral home in Scotland. In 1845, Nicolas Worthington freed seventeen of his slaves, and gave them  of the "Athol enlarged" land which was then called "Freetown". The community was briefly a postal town named Atholton, Maryland. The school sites were later considered part of Simpsonville, Maryland, and later Columbia, Maryland.

The Howard County school system was segregated since the building of the Ellicott City Colored School in 1888. The first Atholton school was a one-room colored school house next to Locust Church given by John R. and Susie Clark in 1885. Students transferred to Guilford in 1939. School property was bought for $200 by the Locust Church. In 1941, an additional acre was not accounted for, then sold on a separate bid for $701 to Herbert M Brown.

Harriet Tubman site
In 1948, a new 10-room high school called Atholton Colored School was ordered. It was designed by Francis Thuman to be built in Simpsonville with a $280,000 budget. The cornerstone was set on September 25, 1948, by the Colored Masonic Lodge. Clarksville students were used to operate the bulldozers used in grading. At the students request, the school was renamed to the Harriet Tubman High School. In 1954, Segregation was outlawed by the supreme court in Brown v. Board of Education. Howard County eliminated one class of segregated students a year, taking 11 years to implement integrated classes. Modern accounts of the development of Columbia note that Rouse Company donanted land for public schools, but prior to the requirement, the company sold unusable land from its 1963 purchases to build Columbia back to the school board. The company sold 10 usable acres, and 10 unbuildable acres adjoining the school, at market rate, to "meet new state standards".

The High School would later be renamed the Harriet Tubman building, to be used by the Board of Education. In 1981 Grassroots Crisis Center operated a homeless shelter from the facility. In 2006, James N. Robey issued $1.6 million in Howard County loans to Grassroots to build an enlarged homeless facility on the Atholton School grounds. Centered around the 50th anniversary of desegregation at the school, The Howard County Center of African American Culture has petitioned to relocate from Oakland Manor to the Harriet Tubman building. The offices used by school system were listed as the top endangered historical site in Howard county by Preservation Howard County in 2015.

Atholton High School

In 1966 a new integrated high school was built alongside the old school taking the name Atholton High School. The school has been renovated and expanded several times. In 2012 a $51.3 million project was started to renovate the school again with students in place. The structure will use temporary classrooms in its expansion from 206,000 square ft to 250,000 sf.

Students
Atholton's student population has been in flux over the past 15 years. In 2017, Atholton is designed for 1,460 students with a current enrollment of 1,479 students. Atholton is currently a 3A school. Proposed redistricting by the Howard County Public School System would move approximately 16 percent of the Howard County student population from their current school. However, there are doubts over whether such plans will take action.

The student population as of December 2021 is <5% Native American, 31.5% Black or African American, 18.1% Asian, 31*.5% White or Caucasian, <5% Pacific Islander, 12% Hispanic, and 6.6%Two or more races.

Athletics

Atholton has won the following state championships & athletic accomplishments:

2019 - Girls' Volleyball, 3A State Champions
2018 - Girls Outdoor Track and Field, State Champions  
2017 - Ice Hockey, Howard Conference Finalist, State Semi-Finalist
2017 - Ice Hockey, Howard Conference Champions, Undefeated
2017- Girls Basketball, 3A State Finalists
2016 - Girls' Volleyball, 3A State Champions
2016 - Ice Hockey, Howard Conference Varsity Finalist, State Semi-Finalist
2015 - Ice Hockey, Howard Conference Varsity Finalist, State Semi-Finalist
2014 - Golf District 3A Champion
2014 - Ice Hockey, Howard Conference Varsity Champions, State Semi-Finalist
2013 - Ice Hockey, Howard Conference Varsity Champions, State Semi-Finalist
2012 - Ice Hockey, Maryland Student Hockey League State 2A Varsity Champions
2012 - Ice Hockey, Howard Conference 2A Varsity Champions
2012 - Field Hockey, 3A State Champions
2012 - Girls' Golf County Champions 
2011 - Howard County Football Champions
2011 - Boys' Indoor Track
2008 - Boys' Cross Country
2007 - Girls' Basketball
2007 - Tennis Mixed Doubles
2006 - Boys' Indoor Track 3A-2A
2005 - Girls' Track & Field
2004 - Boys' Soccer -
2003 - Ice Hockey, Howard Conference 2A Varsity Champions
2002 - Ice Hockey, Howard Conference 2A Varsity Champions
2002 - Baseball
2001 - Girls' Track & Field
1998 - Boys' Indoor Track 2A-1A
1997 - Boys' Indoor Track 2A-1A
1997 - Boys' Track & Field
1996 - Boys' Track & Field
1995 - Boys' Indoor Track 2A-1A
1995 - Tennis Mixed Doubles
1990 - Boys' Soccer
1989 - Girls' Volleyball
1989 - Boys' Cross Country
1989 - Girls' Cross Country
1988 - Girls' Volleyball
1988 - Girls' Cross Country
1988 - Ice Hockey, Founding Member, Maryland Student Hockey League
1987 - Girls' Cross Country
1967 - Boys' Cross Country

Notable alumni
John H. Brodie, theoretical physicist
Jack Douglass, YouTube celebrity
Gallant, singer-songwriter
Lauren Giddings, graduate of Mercer Law School and murder victim
Greg Hawkes, keyboardist for The Cars
Thomas Hong, short track speed skater
Brendan Iribe, former CEO and co-founder of Oculus Rift
Josh Kelly, actor
Allan H. Kittleman, former Howard County Executive, former Maryland State Senator and Minority Leader
Alan Landsman, former vocalist and bass guitarist (member of Poison the Well) and convicted mail fraudster
Steve Lombardozzi Jr., former infielder in the Miami Marlins organization
Tatyana McFadden, Paralympian athlete and first person, able bodied or other, to win the four major marathons in the same year (Boston Marathon, London Marathon, New York Marathon, and the Chicago Marathon.)
DeWanda Wise, actress

Special programs
Raider Review  (school newspaper)
FIRST Robotics

See also
Harriet Tubman School

References and notes

External links

Website
Image on Google Maps

Public high schools in Maryland
Educational institutions established in 1966
Public schools in Howard County, Maryland
1966 establishments in Maryland
Buildings and structures in Columbia, Maryland